ANZAC Square Arcade is a shopping centre in Brisbane, Queensland, Australia. It is within the Anzac Square Building on the corner of Edward Street and Adelaide Street, adjacent to ANZAC Square from which it derives its name. The building is diagonally opposite QueensPlaza.

ANZAC Square Arcade has a number of specialty shops, a pharmacy, a dental surgery and a food court.

It has access to Central Station, and Queensland Rail City network timetables are displayed within the arcade.

Gallery

References

Shopping centres in Brisbane
Adelaide Street, Brisbane
Edward Street, Brisbane
ANZAC (Australia)